Greek numerals, also known as Ionic, Ionian, Milesian, or Alexandrian numerals, are a system of writing numbers using the letters of the Greek alphabet. In modern Greece, they are still used for ordinal numbers and in contexts similar to those in which Roman numerals are still used in the Western world. For ordinary cardinal numbers, however, modern Greece uses Arabic numerals.

History
The Minoan and Mycenaean civilizations' Linear A and Linear B alphabets used a different system, called Aegean numerals, which included number-only symbols for powers of ten:  = 1,  = 10,  = 100,  = 1000, and  = 10000.

Attic numerals comprised another system that came into use perhaps in the 7th century BCE. They were acrophonic, derived (after the initial one) from the first letters of the names of the numbers represented. They ran  = 1,  = 5,  = 10,  = 100,  = 1,000, and  = 10,000.

The present system probably developed around Miletus in Ionia. 19th century classicists placed its development in the 3rd century BCE, the occasion of its first widespread use. More thorough modern archaeology has caused the date to be pushed back at least to the 5th century BCE, a little before Athens abandoned its pre-Euclidean alphabet in favour of Miletus's in 402 BCE, and it may predate that by a century or two. The present system uses the 24 letters used by Euclid, as well as three Phoenician and Ionic ones that had not been dropped from the Athenian alphabet (although kept for numbers): digamma, koppa, and sampi. The position of those characters within the numbering system imply that the first two were still in use (or at least remembered as letters) while the third was not. The exact dating, particularly for sampi, is problematic since its uncommon value means the first attested representative near Miletus does not appear until the 2nd century BCE, and its use is unattested in Athens until the 2nd century CE.

Description

Greek numerals are decimal, based on powers of 10. The units from 1 to 9 are assigned to the first nine letters of the old Ionic alphabet from alpha to theta. Instead of reusing these numbers to form multiples of the higher powers of ten, however, each multiple of ten from 10 to 90 was assigned its own separate letter from the next nine letters of the Ionic alphabet from iota to koppa. Each multiple of one hundred from 100 to 900 was then assigned its own separate letter as well, from rho to sampi. (That this was not the traditional location of sampi in the Ionic alphabetical order has led classicists to conclude that sampi had fallen into disuse as a letter by the time the system was created.)

This alphabetic system operates on the additive principle in which the numeric values of the letters are added together to obtain the total. For example, 241 was represented as  (200 + 40 + 1). (It was not always the case that the numbers ran from highest to lowest: a 4th-century BC inscription at Athens placed the units to the left of the tens. This practice continued in Asia Minor well into the Roman period.) In medieval manuscripts of the Book of Revelation, the number of the Beast 666 is written as  (600 + 60 + 6). (Numbers larger than 1,000 reused the same letters but included various marks to note the change.) Fractions were indicated as the denominator followed by a keraia (ʹ);  γʹ indicated one third, δʹ one fourth and so on. As an exception, special symbol ∠ʹ indicated one half, and γ°ʹ or γoʹ was two-thirds. These fractions were additive (also known as Egyptian fractions); for example  indicated .

Although the Greek alphabet began with only majuscule forms, surviving papyrus manuscripts from Egypt show that uncial and cursive minuscule forms began early. These new letter forms sometimes replaced the former ones, especially in the case of the obscure numerals. The old Q-shaped koppa (Ϙ) began to be broken up ( and ) and simplified ( and ). The numeral for 6 changed several times. During antiquity, the original letter form of digamma (Ϝ) came to be avoided in favour of a special numerical one. This eventually merged with the sigma-tau ligature stigma ϛ ( or ).

In modern Greek, a number of other changes have been made. Instead of extending an over bar over an entire number, the keraia (lit. "hornlike projection") is marked to its upper right, a development of the short marks formerly used for single numbers and fractions. The modern keraia is a symbol similar to the acute accent (´), the tonos (U+0384,΄) and the prime symbol (U+02B9, ʹ), but has its own Unicode character as U+0374. A lower left keraia (Unicode: U+0375, "Greek Lower Numeral Sign") is now standard for distinguishing thousands: 2019 is represented as ͵ΒΙΘʹ.

The declining use of ligatures in the 20th century also means that stigma is frequently written as the separate letters ΣΤʹ, although a single keraia is used for the group.

Isopsephy

The practice of adding up the number values of Greek letters of words, names and phrases, thus connecting the meaning of words, names and phrases with others with equivalent numeric sums, is called isopsephy. A similar practice adapted for the Hebrew alphabet is referred to as gematria.

Table

 Alternatively, sub-sections of manuscripts are sometimes numbered by lowercase characters (αʹ. βʹ. γʹ. δʹ. εʹ. ϛʹ. ζʹ. ηʹ. θʹ.).

Higher numbers
In his text The Sand Reckoner, the natural philosopher Archimedes gives an upper bound of the number of grains of sand required to fill the entire universe, using a contemporary estimation of its size.  This would defy the then-held notion that it is impossible to name a number greater than that of the sand on a beach or on the entire world.  In order to do that, he had to devise a new numeral scheme with much greater range.

Pappus of Alexandria reports that Apollonius of Perga developed a simpler system based on powers of the myriad;  was 10,000,  was 10,0002 = 100,000,000,  was 10,0003 = 1012 and so on.

Zero

Hellenistic astronomers extended alphabetic Greek numerals into a sexagesimal positional numbering system by limiting each position to a maximum value of 50 + 9 and including a special symbol for zero, which was only used alone for a whole table cell, rather than combined with other digits, like today's modern zero, which is a placeholder in positional numeric notation. This system was probably adapted from Babylonian numerals by Hipparchus . It was then used by Ptolemy, Theon and Theon's daughter Hypatia (died 415). The symbol for zero is clearly different from that of the value for 70, omicron or "ο". In the 2nd-century papyrus shown here, one can see the symbol for zero in the lower right, and a number of larger omicrons elsewhere in the same papyrus.

In Ptolemy's table of chords, the first fairly extensive trigonometric table, there were 360 rows, portions of which looked as follows:

 
Each number in the first column, labeled  is the number of degrees of arc on a circle.  Each number in the second column, labeled  is the length of the corresponding chord of the circle, when the diameter is 120.  Thus  represents an 84° arc, and the ∠′ after it means one-half, so that πδ∠′ means °.  In the next column we see  , meaning .  That is the length of the chord corresponding to an arc of ° when the diameter of the circle is 120. The next column, labeled  for "sixtieths", is the number to be added to the chord length for each 1° increase in the arc, over the span of the next 12°.  Thus that last column was used for linear interpolation.

The Greek sexagesimal placeholder or zero symbol changed over time: The symbol used on papyri during the second century was a very small circle with an overbar several diameters long, terminated or not at both ends in various ways. Later, the overbar shortened to only one diameter, similar to the modern o-macron (ō) which was still being used in late medieval Arabic manuscripts whenever alphabetic numerals were used. But the overbar was omitted in Byzantine manuscripts, leaving a bare ο (omicron). This gradual change from an invented symbol to ο does not support the hypothesis that the latter was the initial of  meaning "nothing". Note that the letter ο was still used with its original numerical value of 70; however, there was no ambiguity, as 70 could not appear in the fractional part of a sexagesimal number, and zero was usually omitted when it was the integer.

Some of Ptolemy's true zeros appeared in the first line of each of his eclipse tables, where they were a measure of the angular separation between the center of the Moon and either the center of the Sun (for solar eclipses) or the center of Earth's shadow (for lunar eclipses). All of these zeros took the form , where Ptolemy actually used three of the symbols described in the previous paragraph. The vertical bar (|) indicates that the integral part on the left was in a separate column labeled in the headings of his tables as digits (of five arc-minutes each), whereas the fractional part was in the next column labeled minute of immersion, meaning sixtieths (and thirty-six-hundredths) of a digit.

See also

 
 
 
 
  (acrophonic, not alphabetic, numerals)
 , based on the Greek system

References

External links

 The Greek Number Converter

Numeral systems
Numerals
Numerals